The Iron Heel is a political novel in the form of science fiction by American writer Jack London, first published in 1908.

Background 
The main premise of the book is the rise of a socialist mass movement in the United Statesstrong enough to have a real chance of winning national elections, getting to power, and implementing a radical socialist regime. Conservatives feel alarmed and threatened by this prospect, to the point of seizing power and establishing a brutal dictatorship in order to avert it. 

There were some grounds for London to speculate in that direction. In fact, the labor activity in the U.S. had been growing since the late 19th century, with a fourfold increase in union membership in the U.S. from 1880-1890 and a tide of union activity in the next few decades. The armament industry of U.S., among others, became strongholds of workers and antiwar militancy; labor unrest peaked in 1919 with over four million workers on strike. By the 1930s and into the 1940s, the largest share of the total labor unrest was in North America; from 1941, with over 4,300 strikes involving 2 million workers. In 1945, a strike by Oil Worker International Union at a Standard Oil facility, spread, affecting the highest number of workers in U.S. history – over 10 percent of the U.S. labor force, with over 5,000 strikes of 4.6 million workers..All that labor militancy was, however, never channeled into a political party with a radical Socialist program. Rather, American unions found a political home in the Democratic Party, which neither was nor claimed to be Socialist, and American Conservatives never felt impelled to take such drastic steps as London foresaw.
  
Something like London's scenario did happen in other countries. Mass left-wing movements arose in Italy in the early 1920s, in Germany in the early 1930s, and in Spain in the late 1930s, leading Conservatives in those countries to support, respectively, Benito Mussolini, Adolf Hitler, and Francisco Franco, out of motives similar to those of Jack London's "Oligarchs". London foresaw the oligarchic tyranny arising in the English-speaking United States and Britain while Germany and Austria would, for a time, hold out against it before finally succumbing; in practice, it would be Nazi Germany which spearheaded fascism in its most virulent form, while the British and Americans stood against it.

The book is considered to be "the earliest of the modern dystopian fiction", in the form of social science fiction as employed by novels such as We, Brave New World, and A Canticle for Leibowitz, it chronicles the rise of an oligarchic tyranny in the United States. In The Iron Heel, Jack London's socialist views are explicitly on display. A distant forerunner of dystopian political novels and stories of the 1950s, 1960s, and 70s, such as Aldous Huxley's Brave New World, the book stresses future changes in society and politics while paying much less attention to technological changes. The book is unusual among London's writings (and in the literature of the time in general) in being a first-person narrative of a woman protagonist written by a man. Much of the narrative is set in the San Francisco Bay Area. Other events take place in Sonoma County.

Summary
The novel is told via the framing device of a manuscript found centuries after the action takes place and footnotes by a scholar, Anthony Meredith, circa 2600 AD or 419 B.O.M. (the Brotherhood of Man). Jack London writes at two levels, sporadically having Meredith correcting the errors of Avis Everhard through his own future prism, while at the same time exposing the often incomplete understanding of this distant future perspective. Meredith's introduction also reveals that the protagonist's efforts will fail, giving the work an air of foreordained tragedy. 

The story proper begins with Avis Everhard, a daughter of a renowned physicist, John Cunningham, and future wife of socialist Ernest Everhard. At first, Avis Everhard does not agree with Ernest's assertion that the whole contemporary social system is based on exploitation of labour. She proceeds to investigate the conditions the workers live in, and those terrible conditions make her change her mind and accept Ernest's worldview. Similarly, Bishop Morehouse does not initially believe in the horrors described by Ernest but then becomes convinced of their truth and is confined to a madhouse because of his new views.

The story covers the years 1912 through 1932 in which the Oligarchy (or "Iron Heel") arises in the United States. Japan conquers East Asia and creates its own empire, India gains independence, and Europe becomes socialist. Canada, Mexico, and Cuba form their own Oligarchies and are aligned with the U.S. (London remains silent as to events transpiring in the rest of the world.)

In North America, the Oligarchy maintains power for three centuries until the Revolution succeeds and ushers in the Brotherhood of Man. During the years of the novel, the First Revolt is described and preparations for the Second Revolt are discussed. From the perspective of Everhard, the imminent Second Revolt is sure to succeed. Given Meredith's frame story, the reader knows that Ernest Everhard's hopes will go unfulfilled until centuries after his death.

The Oligarchy is the largest monopoly of trusts (or robber barons) who manage to squeeze out the middle class by bankrupting most small to mid-sized business as well as reducing all farmers to effective serfdom. This Oligarchy maintains power through a "labor caste" and the Mercenaries. Laborers in essential industries like steel and rail are elevated and given decent wages, housing, and education. Indeed, the tragic turn in the novel (and Jack London's core warning to his contemporaries) is the treachery of these favored unions which break with the other unions and side with the Oligarchy. Further, a second, military caste is formed: the Mercenaries. The Mercenaries are officially the army of the US but are in fact in the employ of the Oligarchs.

Asgard is the name of a fictional wonder-city, constructed by the Oligarchy to be admired and appreciated as well as lived in. Thousands of proletarians live in terrible poverty there, and are used whenever a public work needs to be completed, such as the building of a levee or a canal.

Analysis

Jack London ambitiously predicted a breakdown of the US republic starting a few years past 1908, but various events caused his predicted future to diverge from actual history. Most crucially, though London placed quite accurately the time when international tensions would reach their peak (1913 in The Iron Heel, 1914 in actual history), he (like many others at the time) predicted that when this moment came, labor solidarity would prevent a war that would include the US, Germany and other nations.

Further, London assumed that the Socialist Party would become a mass party in the United States, strong enough to have a realistic chance of winning national elections and gaining power, while remaining a revolutionary party still committed to the dismantling of capitalism. The whole book is based on Marx's view that capitalism is inherently unsustainable. This would precipitate a brutal counter-reaction, with capitalists preserving their power by discarding democracy and instituting a brutal repressive regime. Although this exact scenario did not come to pass in the US, where the Socialist Party remained small and marginal, events closely followed London's script elsewhere; for example, in Chile in 1973, the government of socialist president Salvador Allende was overthrown by a CIA-backed coup led by General Augusto Pinochet. This prompted later publishers of London's book to use a cover illustration depicting a poster of Allende being ground beneath the heel of a boot.

The idea of a strong and militant mass Socialist Party emerging in the US was linked by London with his prediction that the middle class would shrink as monopolistic trusts crushed labor and small- to mid-sized businesses. Instead the US Progressive Era led to a breakup of the trusts, notably the application of the Sherman Antitrust Act to Standard Oil in 1911. At the same time, reforms such as labor unions rights were passed during the Progressive Era, with further reforms during the New Deal of the 1930s. Further, economic prosperity led to dramatic growth of the middle class in the 1920s and after World War II.

Through the writing of Everhard and, particularly, the distant future perspective of Meredith, London demonstrated his belief in the historical materialism, which Marxists such as Friedrich Engels, Georgi Plekhanov or Vladimir Lenin have interpreted as predicting an inevitable succession from feudalism through capitalism and then socialism, ending in a period without a state (also known as full communism), based on Marx's maxim of "from each according to his ability, to each according to his need."

Publication history and reception
The Iron Heel was published in 1908 by George Platt Brett Sr., who suggested only the deletion of a footnote which he deemed libelous before publication. It sold 50,000 copies in hardcover but generally did not earn the praise of critics. A reviewer in The Outlook concluded that "as a work of fiction it has little to commend it, and as a socialist tract it is distinctly unconvincing".

Influences and effects
The Iron Heel is cited by George Orwell's biographer Michael Shelden as having influenced Orwell's most famous novel Nineteen Eighty-Four. Orwell himself described London as having made "a very remarkable prophecy of the rise of Fascism" and believed that London's understanding of the primitive had made him a better prophet "than many better-informed and more logical thinkers."
Specifically, Orwell's protagonist Winston Smith, like London's Avis Everhard, keeps a diary where he writes down his rebellious thoughts and experiences. However, while Everhard's diary remained hidden during the centuries of tyranny to be discovered and published later, Smith's diary falls into the hands of the book's harsh Thought Police, whose interrogator tells Smith not to expect posterity to vindicate him: "Posterity will never hear of you, we will vaporize you". 

Harry Bridges, influential labor leader in the mid-1900s, was "set afire" by Jack London's The Sea-Wolf and The Iron Heel.

Granville Hicks, reviewing Kurt Vonnegut's Player Piano, was reminded of The Iron Heel: "we are taken into the future and shown an America ruled by a tiny oligarchy, and here too there is a revolt that fails."

Chapter 7 of The Iron Heel is an almost verbatim copy of an ironic essay by Frank Harris (see ).

London's novella The Scarlet Plague (1912), and some of his short stories, are placed in a dystopian future setting that closely resembles that of The Iron Heel, although there is no actual continuity of situations or characters.

Frederic Tuten's debut novel The Adventures of Mao on the Long March uses extensive quotes from The Iron Heel, placing them alongside details of Chinese history from 1912 to Mao's rise to power.

Adaptations
The novel has been adapted into two Russian films: The Iron Heel (1919) and The Iron Heel of Oligarchy (1999). The first was produced in the immediate aftermath of the October Revolution, and the second was produced when real-life Oligarchs came to dominate the economy of post-Soviet Russia.

A stage adaptation by Edward Einhorn was produced in 2016 in New York. According to The New York Times, "it serves up food for thought with an appealing heart-on-sleeve warmth". The adaptation was turned into a three-part audio drama podcast in 2021.

See also
 Business Plot - an alleged 1933 political conspiracy by businessmen to overthrow the United States government in reaction to economic reforms.

References

Sources
 Francis Shor: Power, Gender, and Ideological Discourse in 'The Iron Heel' . In: Leonard Cassuto, Jeanne Campbell Reesman: Rereading Jack London. Stanford University Press 1998, pp. 75–91
 Tony Barley: Prediction, Programme and Fantasy in Jack London's 'The Iron Heel' . In David Seed: Anticipations: Essays on Early Science Fiction and its Precursors. Syracuse University Press 1995, pp. 153–171
 John Whalen-Bridge: Political Fiction and the American Self. University of Illinois Press 1998, pp. 73–100

External links

Digital editions
 
 
 
 
 The Iron Heel audio drama

Criticism
 Review by Spike Magazine
 "How did Jack London's socialist adventures end?" by Ben Myers

1908 American novels
1908 science fiction novels
American novels adapted into films
American novels adapted into plays
American political novels
American science fiction novels
Dystopian novels
Macmillan Publishers books
Norse mythology in popular culture
Novels involved in plagiarism controversies
Novels by Jack London
Novels set in San Francisco
Science fiction novels adapted into films
Future history